HD 76653 is a single star in the southern constellation Vela. It is faintly visible to the naked eye with an apparent visual magnitude of +5.71. The star is moving closer to the Sun with a radial velocity of −6 km/s. Both are likely members of the Ursa Major association.

This is an F-type main-sequence star with a stellar classification of F6 V. It is larger than the Sun, with 1.22 times the mass of the Sun and 1.35 times the Sun's luminosity. The star is radiating 2.72 times the Sun's luminosity from its photosphere at an effective temperature of about 6,296 K. Pace (2013) estimates HD 76653 to be 770 million years old, while Fuhrmann and Chini (2012) date it to an age of around two billion years. The metallicity is near solar and it is spinning with a projected rotational velocity of 10.3 km/s.

HD 76653 displays an infrared excess that suggests the presence of an orbiting debris disk. This excess was detected with the Spitzer Space Telescope both by the IRS instrument at 30−34 μm and weakly by MIPS at 70 μm. The dust has a temperature of about 73−77 K and is orbiting at a mean distance of 16−18 AU from the host star.

References

F-type main-sequence stars
Vela (constellation)
3570
Durchmusterung objects
076653
043797